Benjamin Bellot (born 30 July 1990) is a German footballer who plays as a goalkeeper for BSG Chemie Leipzig of the Regionalliga Nordost.

Career

Youth
As a youth, he played for VfB Leipzig and FC Sachsen Leipzig before moving to RB Leipzig.

RB Leipzig
Bellot was with RB Leipzig from when the club was founded in 2009. After RB Leipzig reached promotion to Bundesliga and signed goalkeeper Marius Müller, Bellot joined the reserve team for the 2016-17 season.

Brøndby
In June 2017, Bellot signed a two-year contract with Danish Superliga side Brøndby IF. He was released by the club at the end of the 2018–19 season after serving as a backup for Frederik Rønnow and Marvin Schwäbe, respectively, in his two seasons there.

BSG Chemie Leipzig
On 6 July 2019, Bellot signed with Regionalliga Nordost club BSG Chemie Leipzig on a one-year deal. He made his debut on 27 July in a 0–0 draw against FSV Wacker 90 Nordhausen.

Honours
RB Leipzig
 NOFV-Oberliga Süd: 2010
 Saxony Cup: 2011, 2013
 Regionalliga Nordost: 2013

Brøndby
Danish Cup: 2017-18

References

External links
 
 

1990 births
Living people
German footballers
Footballers from Leipzig
Association football goalkeepers
2. Bundesliga players
3. Liga players
Regionalliga players
Danish Superliga players
FC Sachsen Leipzig players
RB Leipzig players
Brøndby IF players
BSG Chemie Leipzig (1997) players
German expatriate footballers
German expatriate sportspeople in Denmark
Expatriate men's footballers in Denmark